R'žaničino is a village in the municipality of Petrovec, North Macedonia.

Demographics
According to the 1467-68 Ottoman defter, R'žaničino (Rezhança) appears as being inhabited by mixed Orthodox Slavic-Albanian population. Some families had a mixed Slav-Albanian anthroponomy - usually a Slavic first name and an Albanian last name or last names with Albanian patronyms and Slavic suffixes.   

According to the 2002 census, the village had a total of 855 inhabitants. Ethnic groups in the village include:
Macedonians 628
Bosniaks 137
Serbs 45
Albanians 32
Others 13

As of the 2021 census, R'žaničino had 1,043 residents with the following ethnic composition:
Macedonians 687
Bosniaks 226
Persons for whom data are taken from administrative sources 49
Albanians 42
Serbs 25
Others 14

References

External links

Villages in Petrovec Municipality